Sitaram Daga was an Indian politician. He was a Member of Parliament, representing West Bengal in the Rajya Sabha the upper house of India's Parliament as a member of the Indian National Congress.

References

Rajya Sabha members from West Bengal
1923 births
2014 deaths
Indian National Congress politicians